don Carlos (Lat.: Carolus) Fernández de Velasco, born 1596-died Brussels, 1665 was the 38th abbot of Grimbergen Abbey during 1647–1665.

Born in a Spanish important noble family, he was the son of don Santiago Carlos de Velasco and Joanne Gentry. He is a relative of Bernardino Fernández de Velasco, 6th Duke of Frías. 

Abbot de Velasco is elected in 1647, and approved by Emperor Leopold II. during his abbatiaat he took the vows of Daniel  Bellemans, a poet.

Velasco is known to be the builder of the abbey church of Grimbergen in 1660, almost completed at his death. During his period as abbot multiple buildings were erected.
Sanderus referred to him in a text.

References

Fernández de Velasco family
Abbots of the Spanish Netherlands
1596 births
1665 deaths